KX and variants may refer to:

Businesses and brands 
 Pentax KX, a 35mm film SLR camera model
 Pentax K-x, a digital SLR camera model
 Cayman Airways (IATA code KX)
 KX Television, a network of four CBS affiliates under flagship KXMC-TV
 Kx Systems, a software company focused on real-time analytics
 KX 91.5. Philippines, a brand name for DXKX

Other uses 
 Family Kx, a large group of the New Testament manuscripts
 Kings Cross railway station, London
 k͡x, symbol for the voiceless velar affricate in the International Phonetic Alphabet

See also
 9945 Karinaxavier or 1990 KX, an asteroid